Tim Flakoll (born October 8, 1959) is an American politician. He was a member of the North Dakota State Senate from the 44th District of North Fargo, serving from December 1, 1998 through November 30, 2016. Senator Flakoll served on the Senate Education committee for 18 years including serving as Vice-Chairman and as Chair from 2012 - 2016. Flakoll Chaired the Senate Agriculture committee for ten years from 2002 until 2012. All bills in North Dakota receive hearings and votes on the floor. In the 14 years that Flakoll  Chaired the Senate Education or Senate Agriculture committees, those committees never lost a committee recommendation on the Senate floor during a floor vote.

On March 15, 2018 Flakoll announced his candidacy for a seat on the Fargo, ND City Commission. The election was won by the incumbent commissioners.

Flakoll was elected President Pro Tempore of the Senate, serving his term in 2013-2014 (limited by rule to one term).

Flakoll has served as Provost for Tri-College University of Fargo-Moorhead, which includes Concordia College of Moorhead, MSUM, NDSU, M State and the North Dakota State College of Science.

He is a member of the Republican party.

Flakoll was a founding employee member of the Fargo Moorhead RedHawks minor league professional baseball team. From 1995-2001 he served in various positions of increasing responsibility including Vice-President and General Manager. During those years the club qualified for the playoffs every year. Baseball America magazine named the 1998 RedHawks the Independent Team of the Decade for the 1990s (FMRedHawks.com).As VP and General Manager the RedHawks won their club's first Northern League Championship and set annual attendance records.

References

Living people
1959 births
Presidents pro tempore of the North Dakota Senate
Republican Party North Dakota state senators
21st-century American politicians
People from Ellendale, North Dakota